Matthew Blake Simon (born 22 January 1986) is a retired Australian international football (soccer) player who played as a striker. Simon attended St Edward's College, East Gosford, where he was influenced to play soccer.

Simon started his senior career with Central Coast Lightning before joining Central Coast Mariners in 2006. In 2012, Simon signed with K-League club Chunnam Dragons, however, his opportunities at the club were limited by persistent injuries. In 2013, Simon rejoined the Mariners. He moved to Sydney FC after being released by the Mariners in 2015, before again returning to the Mariners in 2018. Simon remains the Mariners' all-time leading goal scorer, as well as a 7-time Mariners’ Golden Boot winner, record holder for the most substitute appearances in Australian league history, and scorer of the latest goal recorded in an A-League regular season match.

Simon has made two appearances for the Australia national team. He also appeared for Australia U23 at the 2008 Summer Olympics.

Club career

Central Coast Mariners
He was added to the Mariners' squad in the week leading up to their 2006 Pre-Season Cup play-off against Newcastle Jets.  Simon was then brought back to the squad after Nik Mrdja suffered a heel injury before the round 19 clash against Newcastle. He starred for the Central Coast Lightning during their 2006 NSW Winter Super League campaign. Simon had a solid 07–08 season with the Mariners despite not scoring any goals. In the first league game for the 08–09 season Simon immediately broke his duck and scored off a header that would prove to be the start of his wonderful season.

After a successful 08–09 season, in January 2009, he was offered a 2-year contract by Major League Soccer club Colorado Rapids but turned it down citing his preference to remain in Australia with the possibility of playing in Europe in the future. Later in the year, he extended his contract with Central Coast Mariners, staying with the club until 2012.

Move to South Korea
On 30 December 2011 it was announced that he had signed a three-year contract worth $400,000 per year to play for K-League side Jeonnam Dragons. It was later announced that Jeonnam Dragons paid a transfer fee of $170,000 to acquire the player.

Return to Central Coast Mariners
On 16 May 2013 it was announced that he had re-signed with the Mariners.

Sydney FC
On 3 August 2015 it was announced that Matt Simon had signed with Sydney FC, reuniting with his former coach Graham Arnold after he penned a one-year deal with the club. Arnold said the capture of Simon would add a new dimension to his squad. In Round 4 of the 2015–16 A-League, Simon scored twice as they beat his old club 3–1, after coming on as a substitute.

On 20 July 2016, Simon signed a one-year extension to his contract.

Despite coming off the bench for all of his 25 league games of the 2016–2017 season, Simon signed a one-year contract extension with the Sky Blue until the end of the 2017–2018 season. Simon was part of the title winning squad, winning the double in 2016–17.

On 24 March 2018, Simon came off the bench for Sydney FC in a match against his former club, and scored the winning goal in 90+3, which ultimately would set Sydney FC up to winning the A-League Premiership for the 2017–2018 season.

Second return to Central Coast Mariners
On 10 May 2018, Simon left Sydney FC and signed once again with the Central Coast Mariners, on a two-year contract. On 26 October 2018, he was announced as the Mariners new club captain.

On 3 October 2022, Simon announced his retirement from football, following a neck injury sustained in the 2021 FFA Cup, which had ruled him out of the entire 2021–22 A-League Men season.

International career
Simon played frequently for Australia under-23 (the Olyroos) in 2008. In May of that year he scored a hat-trick for the side in a 3–1 win over Republic of Ireland in Malaysia. Simon was originally named as an alternate player for the Olyroos at the 2008 Olympic Games in China. However, when Archie Thompson was injured mid-tournament, Simon was added to the playing squad. He played as a second-half substitute in the team's final match, a loss to Ivory Coast.

In May 2008, following strong form for the Olyroos, Simon was called up by Pim Verbeek to the Australian senior side for the first time for a 2010 World Cup qualifier against Iraq. He eventually made his Socceroos debut in January 2009 in a 2011 Asian Cup qualifier against Indonesia in Jakarta, in an Australian team of primarily A-League players. The game finished as a scoreless draw, although Simon did have a goal ruled out for offside. He made a second appearance for Australia in the same competition five weeks later against Kuwait. In what was Simon's first and only start for the side, the Socceroos lost 1–0 in Canberra.

Professional career statistics

Honours
Central Coast Mariners
 A-League Premiership: 2007–08

Sydney FC
A-League Premiership: 2016–17, 2017–18
A-League Championship: 2016–17
FFA Cup: 2017

Individual
 Mariners Medal (Player of the Year): 2008–09
 PFA A-League Team of the Season: 2020–21
 Number 19 retired by Central Coast Mariners: 2022

Records
Top goalscorer in Central Coast Mariners history: 59 goals

See also
List of Central Coast Mariners FC players
List of foreign K League 1 players
List of retired numbers in association football

References

External links
 
 
 Jeonnam Dragons profile
 

1986 births
Living people
Sportsmen from New South Wales
Association football forwards
Central Coast Mariners FC players
Jeonnam Dragons players
Sydney FC players
A-League Men players
K League 1 players
Footballers at the 2008 Summer Olympics
Olympic soccer players of Australia
Australia international soccer players
Australian expatriate soccer players
Australian expatriate sportspeople in South Korea
Expatriate footballers in South Korea
Soccer players from Sydney
Australian soccer players